Lauren Gibbemeyer (born September 8, 1988) is an American indoor volleyball player. She was a member of the United States women's national volleyball team and plays as middle blocker.

Career
She played college women's volleyball at University of Minnesota from 2007 to 2010.

Gibbemeyer was part of the USA national team that won the 2015 FIVB World Grand Prix gold medal.

Lauren Gibbemeyer's early career started with Northern Lights Volleyball Club. In these years she won the 2006 North American Junior Championship. From 2007 to 2010 she played for the University of Minnesota, taking part in the Austin 2009 semifinals against the University of Texas. In 2011, after college she was asked to play for the national team for the first time. She won the bronze medal at the 16th Pan American Games, where she was awarded Best block.
In the 2011-12 season she began her professional career in the Japanese league with Toyota Auto Body Queens. 
The following season she moved to Robursport Volley Pesaro in Italy.
She won the gold medal at the Pan American Cup and the North American Championship with the national team. She also won the silver medal at the Grand Champions Cup.
In the 2013-14 season she played for Lokomotiv Baku, the Azerbaijani Super league. In January 2014, in the second part of the season, she came back to play in the Italian Serie A1* for Imoco Volley Conegliano.
The following season she stayed in Italy, playing for Volleyball Casalmaggiore and winning the league title and the Italian Super Cup in 2015.

She participated in the 2018 FIVB Volleyball Women's Nations League.

Achievements
National team
 Pan-Am Cup Mexico 2012
 Pan-Am Cup Peru 2013
 FIVB World Grand Prix Omaha 2015
 2015 FIVB Women's World Cup
 2013 FIVB Women's World Grand Champions Cup

Clubs
  2016 FIVB Volleyball Women's Club World Championship, with Pomi Casalmaggiore

References

External links
 Profile at FIVB
 

1988 births
Living people
American women's volleyball players
Minnesota Golden Gophers women's volleyball players
Volleyball players at the 2011 Pan American Games
Pan American Games bronze medalists for the United States
Pan American Games medalists in volleyball
Middle blockers
Expatriate volleyball players in Azerbaijan
American expatriate sportspeople in Azerbaijan
Sportspeople from Rhode Island
Expatriate volleyball players in Italy
American expatriate sportspeople in Italy
Medalists at the 2011 Pan American Games
21st-century American women